The Blue Cross & Blue Shield of Rhode Island Headquarters is a LEED Certified high-rise in downtown Providence, Rhode Island.

Location
The building is sited immediately north of the two Waterplace Towers, at the intersection of American Express Plaza and Exchange Street.

Purpose
The public health insurer announced April 19, 2007, its intention to consolidate its operations comprising 1100 employees, which had been scattered throughout the city, into one  12-story building. The $114 million tower will be built on top of a parking garage currently under construction for Intercontinental's neighboring Waterplace condominiums, and is estimated to be finished by early 2010. The economic feasibility of this move is made possible through $25 million worth of tax breaks negotiated with Intercontinental.

Opinion
Mayor David Cicilline was optimistic at the prospect of retaining the 1100 employees in the city adding to the "economy and add to the life and vitality of our city", while the state's governor, Donald Carcieri, worried about the impact a move to occupy such expensive real estate would have on the premiums for the insurer's customers, since the first priority of the Blue Cross & Blue Shield should be the affordable coverage of citizens.

Gallery

References

Skyscraper office buildings in Providence, Rhode Island
Economy of Providence, Rhode Island
Office buildings completed in 2010